Talgach (Bengali: তালগাছ) is a famous Bengali poem written by Rabindranath Tagore. It is included in the poetry book Sishu Bholanath. Tagore wrote it especially for the children. It has 24 rhythmic lines. The poem is about the palm tree.

References

External links 

 rabindra-rachanabali.nltr.org
www.bangla-kobita.com

Poems by Rabindranath Tagore
Bengali-language poems
Poems